Kiss You In The Rain - Max Lorentz Sings David Bowie is the fifth album from Swedish artist Max Lorentz.

The record was released on CD on 8 June 2011 on PB8 Records.

It contains one track each from all of David Bowie's LP's 1967 - 1980 (apart from compilations, live albums and Pin Ups).

The music is mainly acoustic and in the vein of Tom Waits and burlesque and is performed by Max Lorentz with some
help from the leading names in Swedish jazz.

Track listing
 Station to Station PT.1 - from the 1976 David Bowie album "Station to Station"
 Five Years - from the 1972 David Bowie album "The Rise And Fall Of Ziggy Stardust And The Spiders From Mars"
 All the Madmen - from the 1971 David Bowie album "The Man Who Sold The World"
 Be My Wife - from the 1977 David Bowie album "Low"
 Drive In Saturday - from the 1973 David Bowie album "Aladdin Sane"
 Blackout - from the 1977 David Bowie album ""Heroes""
 When I Live My Dream - from the 1967 David Bowie album "David Bowie"
 Scream Like a Baby - from the 1980 David Bowie album "Scary Monsters (And Super Creeps)"
 Rock 'n' Roll With Me - from the 1974 David Bowie album "Diamond Dogs"
 Quicksand - from the 1971 David Bowie album "Hunky Dory"
 Yassassin - from the 1979 David Bowie album "Lodger"
 Cygnet Committee - from the 1969 David Bowie album "Space Oddity"
 Can You Hear Me? - from the 1975 David Bowie album "Young Americans"
 Station to Station PT.2 - from the 1976 David Bowie album "Station to Station"

Personnel
Max Lorentz - guitars, piano, Hammond, bassguitar, accordions, mandolin, zittre, sitar, banjo, cello, zarod, harmonicas, flute, clarinet, trumpet, stylophone, midi-saxofon, synt & percussion
Patrik Boman -  acoustic bass & woodwind arrangement
Bebe Risenfors - tuba
Wojtek Goral - saxophones
Mats Ronander - harmonica (track 9)
Per "Texas" Johansson - clarinet & bass clarinet (track 7)
Karl Martin Almqvist - clarinet, flute & alto-flute (track 7)
André Ferrari - snare-drum (track 12)
Mikael Hujanen - guitar solo (track 14)
Kevin Kirs-Verstege - cello (track 2)
Anna Sise - vocals (track 6)
Ludde Lorentz - vocals (track 6)

References

2011 albums